Upul Fernando (born 8 June 1973) is a Sri Lankan cricketer. He played 153 first-class and 67 List A matches for multiple domestic sides in Sri Lanka between 1991 and 2015. He made his Twenty20 debut on 17 August 2004, for Ragama Cricket Club in the 2004 SLC Twenty20 Tournament. His last first-class match was for Chilaw Marians Cricket Club in the 2014–15 Premier Trophy on 20 March 2015.

See also
 List of Chilaw Marians Cricket Club players

References

External links
 

1973 births
Living people
Sri Lankan cricketers
Antonians Sports Club cricketers
Badureliya Sports Club cricketers
Chilaw Marians Cricket Club cricketers
Colombo Cricket Club cricketers
Lankan Cricket Club cricketers
Matara Sports Club cricketers
Moors Sports Club cricketers
Ragama Cricket Club cricketers
Sinhalese Sports Club cricketers
Place of birth missing (living people)